Gottigere is a suburb in the southern periphery of Bangalore city, along Bannerghatta Road in the Indian state of Karnataka. It is surrounded by the famous NICE Road and smaller areas like Basavanapura and Kalena Agrahara. It has been named after "Gottigere lake" which is near NICE Road. This area has seen fast growth due to many IT companies establishment near Bannerghatta Road & Electronic city.

Demographic
 India census, Gottigere had a population of 11,149. Men constitute 54% of the population and women 46%.

Gottigere has an average literacy rate of 70%, higher than the national average of 59.5%: male literacy is 75%, and female literacy is 63%. In Gottigere, 12% of the population is under 6 years of age.

As of 2007, Gottigere comes with the Bruhat Bangalore Mahanagara Palike (BBMP) Greater Bangalore limits.

Colleges
T. John College (near NICE Road)
Dr. R M L Law College
Perumal Engineering College 
ITM Institute of Hotel Management
AMC Engineering College

==Schools and Pre Schools<ref>[[Schools near Bannerghatta Road (Gottigere)
Government high school saarakki jpnagar 1st phase

References

Neighbourhoods in Bangalore